Corumbataia veadeiros is a species of armored catfish endemic to Brazil, where it is found in tributaries of the Rio das Almas and the Ribeirão dos Bois, both of which are tributaries of the Rio Paranã, in the headwaters of the Rio Tocantins basin, Goiás, central Brazil.  This species grows to a length of  SL.

References

Otothyrinae
Fish of the Tocantins River basin
Endemic fauna of Brazil
Taxa named by Tiago Pinto Carvalho
Fish described in 2008